Anaphlebia is a monotypic moth genus in the subfamily Arctiinae. Its single species, Anaphlebia caudatula, is found in the Amazon region. Both the genus and species were first described by Felder in 1874.

References

External links

Moths described in 1874
Arctiinae
Monotypic moth genera
Moths of South America